Edward Radwanski (born May 5, 1963, Neptune Township, New Jersey) is an American former soccer midfielder.  He spent the five seasons in the Major Indoor Soccer League, one in the Continental Indoor Soccer League and seven in the USISL and its predecessor, the SISL.  He also earned five caps with the U.S. national team in 1985.

Player

Youth and college
Radwanski grew up in New Jersey and graduated from Neptune High School in 1981. In 1999, he was named by The Star-Ledger as one of the top ten New Jersey high school soccer players of the 1980s. In addition to playing with his school teams, he was a member of the Wall Atoms youth club.  After graduating from high school, Radwanski attended the University of North Carolina at Greensboro (UNCG) where he played on the school's NCAA Division III soccer team from 1981 to 1984.  In both 1982 and 1983, UNCG  won the Division III soccer championship.  In 1983 and 1984, Radwanski was named a first team Division III All American and finished his career at UNCG with thirty-eight goals and fifty-six assists.  While he finished his collegiate playing career in 1984, he did not earn his UNCG bachelor's degree in business and economics until 1997, while playing for the Greensboro Dynamo

Professional
In 1985, the expansion Dallas Sidekicks of Major Indoor Soccer League (MISL) made Radwanski the first player drafted by the team when they selected him with the number one pick in the 1985 MISL draft.  He spent three seasons with the Sidekicks, winning the 1986–1987 MISL title with them.  Dallas released Radwanski on June 15, 1988.  In October 1988, Kenny Cooper Sr., head coach of the Baltimore Blast, signed Radwanski to play with the Blast.  However, Radwanski retired a few days later after being told during a team physical that he risked permanent back damage if he continued playing.  Radwanski returned to soccer in 1990 when he joined the Dallas Rockets of the Southwest Independent Soccer League.  In 1991, he was a member of the team when it won the league championship.  In the fall of 1990, he signed with the Tacoma Stars of MISL.  He spent two season with the Stars until they folded at the end of the 1991–1992 season.  In 1993, he moved east to the Greensboro Dynamo of the USISL.  He remained with the Dynamo until 1997.  In 1996, the team renamed itself the Carolina Dynamo.  In both 1993 and 1994, the Dynamo won the USISL outdoor championship.  In 1993, he was both the League and Championship MVPs.  Radwanski returned to the indoor game in 1995 with the Washington Warthogs of the Continental Indoor Soccer League (CISL).

National team
Radwanski earned five caps with the U.S. national team in 1985.  His first cap came in a February 8, 1985 tie with Switzerland.  On May 26, 1985, he played in a 1986 FIFA World Cup qualification match, a 1–1 tie with Costa Rica in Costa Rica.  However, he did not enter the return game in Torrance, California in which Costa Rica defeated the U.S. and knocked them out of contention for the finals.  His last cap came in a 5–0 loss to England on June 16, 1985.

In 1992, he earned one cap with the U.S. National Futsal Team.

Coach
Following his retirement from playing professionally, Radwanski  assisted his alma mater's soccer program as an assistant coach in 1998 while also working in the Carolina Dynamo’s front office.  In 1998 and 1999, he served as the Director of Coaching for the Greensboro Twisters youth club.   He moved to the ranks of professional coaching in 1999, he coached the Piedmont Spark of the second division women's W-2 League.  That year, Radwanski coached the club to the best record in the W-2 before falling to the Hampton Roads Piranhas in the first round of the playoffs.  On February 15, 2001, he replaced Jack Poland as the head coach of the UNCG women's soccer head coach.   In 2006, he was named the Southern Conference Coach of the Year in 2006.  Radwanski has continued his involvement in youth soccer with the Twisters and the Jamestown Soccer Club in addition to his duties as a college soccer coach.  In 2011, Radwanski replaced Hershey Strosberg as coach of the Clemson Tigers women's soccer team.  On August 15, 2014, Radwanski was named in a lawsuit by Haley Ellen Hunt related to an alleged hazing incident on August 18, 2011. In 2016, Radwanski was named ACC Coach of the year after leading Clemson to a 13–3–3 regular season record.  In 2017, Radwanski won his 200th career game as a coach in a match against SIU Edwardsville.

Head coaching record

Honors
Championships
Dallas Sidekicks: 1986-87
Dallas Rockets: 1991
Greensboro Dynamo:  1993, 1994

USISL MPV:  1993

USISL Championship MVP: 1993

Southern Conference Coach of the Year:  2006

Inducted into the UNC-Greensboro Athletics Hall of Fame: 2000

New Jersey first team high school All Decade (1980s)

NSCAA Regional Coach of the Year (2015)

References

External links
 Sidekicks profile
 Radwanski interview
 UNC-G profile
 MISL stats

1963 births
Living people
American men's futsal players
American soccer coaches
American soccer players
Clemson Tigers women's soccer coaches
Continental Indoor Soccer League players
Dallas Rockets players
Dallas Sidekicks (original MISL) players
North Carolina Fusion U23 players
Major Indoor Soccer League (1978–1992) players
Neptune High School alumni
People from Neptune Township, New Jersey
Soccer players from New Jersey
Sportspeople from Monmouth County, New Jersey
Tacoma Stars players
USISL players
UNC Greensboro Spartans men's soccer coaches
UNC Greensboro Spartans women's soccer coaches
UNC Greensboro Spartans men's soccer players
United States men's international soccer players
Washington Warthogs players
American women's soccer coaches
Association football midfielders